Akash Kumar is an Indian boxer. He participated at the 2021 AIBA World Boxing Championships, being awarded the bronze medal in the bantamweight event. Kumar was the first and only person of his county to win a medal. While competing, his mother's death was kept secret from him.

References

External links 

Living people
Place of birth missing (living people)
Year of birth missing (living people)
Indian male boxers
Bantamweight boxers
AIBA World Boxing Championships medalists